Cesare Ambrosini (born 31 March 1990) is an Italian footballer who plays as a centre back for Villa Valle.

Club career
On 15 January 2020, he signed with Serie C club Rimini until the end of the 2019–20 season.

On 8 July 2021, he joined Legnago. On 27 January 2022, his contract with Legnago was terminated by mutual consent.

On 10 February 2022, Ambrosini signed with Serie D club Villa Valle.

References

External links

1990 births
Living people
Sportspeople from the Province of Como
Footballers from Lombardy
Italian footballers
Association football defenders
Serie B players
Serie C players
Serie D players
Como 1907 players
A.C. Renate players
A.S.D. HSL Derthona players
Modena F.C. players
Sondrio Calcio players
Rimini F.C. 1912 players
A.C. Legnano players
Tritium Calcio 1908 players
F.C. Legnago Salus players